Novak Djokovic defeated the two-time defending champion Rafael Nadal in the final, 6–4, 6–4 to win the men's singles tennis title at the 2011 Italian Open. With the win, Djokovic logged his 39th consecutive match win, and extended his unbeaten streak in the 2011 season to 37–0.

Seeds
The top eight seeds received a bye into the second round.

Qualifying

Draw

Finals

Top half

Section 1

Section 2

Bottom half

Section 3

Section 4

References
Main Draw

Italian Open - Singles
Men's Singles